Rod Rathjen is an Australian film director.

Life
He was born in Colbinabbin and graduated from the Victorian College of the Arts in 2010.

Career
His debut feature film is Buoyancy, which won the Panorama Prize from the Ecumenical Jury. He hopes that the movie sheds light on Thailand's fishing industry and educates Cambodians about the risk of migration.

References 

Living people
1981 births
Australian film directors
Victorian College of the Arts alumni
People from Victoria (Australia)